Good Madam is a South African thriller drama film, directed by Jenna Cato Bass and released in 2021. A commentary on the contemporary state of race relations in South Africa in the years following the end of apartheid, the film stars Chumisa Cosa as Tsidi, a single mother who moves back in with her mother Mavis (Nosipho Mtebe) while her mother is working as a live-in caregiver to an elderly white woman.

The film premiered at the 2021 Toronto International Film Festival, where it received an honorable mention for the Platform Prize.

Cast 

 Chumisa Cosa as Tsidi
 Nosipho Mtebe as Mavis
 Kamvalethu Jonas Raziya as Winnie
 Sanda Shandu as Stuart
 Khanyiso Kenqa as Luthando
 Sizwe Ginger Lubengu as Siphenathi
 Siva Sikawuti as Toto
 Chris Gxalaba as Malume Mthunzi
 Peggy Tunyiswa as Xoliswa

References

External links

2021 films
2021 thriller drama films
South African thriller drama films
English-language South African films
Xhosa-language films

South African horror films
Shudder (streaming service) original programming
Films about race and ethnicity